Di Martino (also styled di Martino or DiMartino) is a surname. Notable people with the surname include:

Di Martino
Antonietta Di Martino (born 1978), Italian high jumper and Olympics competitor
Gian Carlo di Martino (born 1964), Venezuelan politician and lawyer
Jean-François Di Martino (born 1967), French fencer and Olympic medalist
Leopoldo Di Martino (born 1949), Italian racing sailor and Olympics competitor
Lorenzo di Niccolò di Martino (1391–1412), Italian painter
Pietro Di Martino ( Pietro De Martino; 1707–1746), Italian mathematician and astronomer
Sophia Di Martino (born 1943), British actor

DiMartino
Christina DiMartino (born 1986), American soccer player; sister of Gina and Vicki DiMartino
Gina DiMartino (born 1988), American soccer player; sister of Christina and Vicki DiMartino
Michael Dante DiMartino (born 1974), American animation director, producer, story editor, and author
Nick DiMartino (born 1946), based author, playwright, book reviewer, and bookseller
Vicki DiMartino (born 1991), American soccer player; sister of Christina and Gina DiMartino
Vincent DiMartino (born 1972), American motorcycle designer and builder

See also
De Martino (surname)
Martino (disambiguation)

Italian-language surnames
Patronymic surnames
Surnames from given names